Thandarambattu is a state assembly constituency in Tiruvannamalai district in Tamil Nadu.

Members of the Legislative Assembly

Election results

2006

2001

1996

1991

1989

1984

1980

1977

1971

References

External links
 

Former assembly constituencies of Tamil Nadu
Tiruvannamalai district